This article lists results for Olympique de Marseille in European competitions. They are the French team to have played the most finals of UEFA competitions and the only one to have won the UEFA Champions League.

Honours
 European Cup/UEFA Champions League
 Winners (1): 1992–93
 Runners-up (1): 1990–91
 UEFA Cup/UEFA Europa League
 Runners-up (3): 1998–99, 2003–04, 2017–18
 UEFA Intertoto Cup
 Winners (1): 2005

Participations
As of October 2020, Marseille have competed in:
15 participations in the European Cup/UEFA Champions League
3 participations in the European Cup Winners' Cup
14 participations in the UEFA Cup/UEFA Europa League
3 participations in the Inter-Cities Fairs Cup
2 participations in the UEFA Intertoto Cup
2 participations in the Intertoto Cup (non UEFA-administered)

Overall record

UEFA competitions statistics
Accurate as of 1 November 2022

Legend: GF = Goals For. GA = Goals Against. GD = Goal Difference.

Non-UEFA competitions statistics
Accurate as of 30 April 2018

Legend: GF = Goals For. GA = Goals Against. GD = Goal Difference.

Matches in Europe

Note 1: With Hajduk Split winning 2–0, the match was interrupted for 15 minutes due to tear gas being thrown onto the stands. The match was voided and awarded 3–0 to Marseille due to the crowd trouble.

Finals

Semi-finals

References

Europe
Marseille